Ha*Ash is an American Latin pop duo that originated in Lake Charles, Louisiana. The videography of Ha*Ash, consists of 3 live/video albums, 3 music video compilations, 32 music videos (25 as a lead artist and 7 as a featured artist), 3 films and 6 television shows. The music video for "Lo Aprendi de Ti", becomes the first YouTube ballad in spanish to reach one billion views.

During 2009, worked on film projects such as the Spanish versions of MGM's Igor. In 2012 Ha*Ash participated in the Talent program La voz... México as co-coaches of the Beto Cuevas team. They also participated in Phineas & Ferb (episode 25), a children's television show. In 2015, they participed in the TV program Ven y Baila Quinceañera. Additionally, they worked on film projects such as the Spanish version of the film Sing: Ven y Canta! and Sing 2: ¡Ven y canta de nuevo!. In 2022, they participated in the Talent program La Voz... México as coaches.

Filmography

Television

Video albums

Concert films and live/video albums

Music video compilations

Music videos

As featured artist

Charity

Other videos

As featured artist

See also 
 Ha*Ash discography
 List of songs recorded by Ha*Ash

References

Notes

Citations

Videographies
Videographies of American artists
American filmographies